The eighth season of the television comedy series The Middle began airing on October 11, 2016, on ABC in the United States. It is produced by Blackie and Blondie Productions and Warner Bros. Television with series creators DeAnn Heline and Eileen Heisler as executive producers. The season contains 23 episodes. The season concluded on May 16, 2017.

The show is about a working-class family, led by Frances "Frankie" Heck (Patricia Heaton), a middle-aged, Midwestern woman married to Michael "Mike" Heck (Neil Flynn), who reside in the small, fictional town of Orson, Indiana. They are the parents of three children, Axl (Charlie McDermott), Sue (Eden Sher) and Brick (Atticus Shaffer).

Cast

Main cast
 Patricia Heaton as Frankie Heck
 Neil Flynn as Mike Heck
 Charlie McDermott as Axl Heck
 Eden Sher as Sue Heck
 Atticus Shaffer as Brick Heck

Recurring
 Daniela Bobadilla as Lexie Brooks, Sue's college roommate and best friend and Axl's new girlfriend as of "The Par-Tay."
 Alphonso McAuley as Charles "Hutch" Hutchinson, Axl's teammate, best friend, and college roommate.
 Tommy Bechtold as Kenny, Axl and Hutch's friend and roommate.
 Greer Grammer as April, Axl's cute but very very dimwitted girlfriend whom he met over the summer. They briefly married before getting an annulment. They remain a couple until breaking up in the episode "Exes and Ohhhs".
 Casey Burke as Cindy Hornberger, Brick's quirky girlfriend.
 Jen Ray as Nancy Donahue, the Hecks' neighbor and Frankie's best friend.
 Sean O'Bryan as Ron Donahue, Nancy's husband and a friend of the Hecks.
 Beau Wirick as Sean Donahue, Axl's best friend from high school.
 Pat Finn as Bill Norwood, a friend and neighbor of the Hecks.
 Jovan Armand as Troy, Brick's classmate and friend.
 Paul Hipp as Reverend Tim-Tom, a youth pastor at the Hecks' church

Guest
 Dave Foley as Dr. Chuck Fulton, Brick's therapist.
 Brooke Shields as Rita Glossner, the Hecks' uncouth and troubled neighbor.
 Emily Rutherfurd as Dierdre Peterson, the Hecks' neighbor who has four children.
 Norm Macdonald as Rusty Heck, Mike's brother.
 John Cullum as "Big Mike" Heck, Mike's father.
 Jack McBrayer as Dr. Ted Goodwin, Frankie's over-friendly boss who is oblivious to sarcasm.
 Gia Mantegna as Devin Levin, Frankie's hairdresser's relative and Axl's college classmate/ex-girlfriend. They break up when Devin thinks they should see others.
 Galadriel Stineman as Cassidy Finch, Axl's ex-girlfriend who broke up with him when they went to different colleges.
 Katlin Mastandrea as "Weird Ashley" Wyman, Axl's weird classmate who has been his accidental date to prom.
 Monica Horan as Anna Ferguson, the matriarch of the Fergusons who accidentally took Brick home when he was a baby (while the Hecks made off with the Ferguson kid).
Horan also played Amy Barone, who was Heaton's sister-in-law on her previous sitcom, Everybody Loves Raymond.
 Alan Rachins as Mort, a clothing store clerk where Frankie and Axl go to buy a suit.

Episodes

Ratings

Notes

References

The Middle (TV series)
2016 American television seasons
2017 American television seasons